The 2012–13 NC State Wolfpack men's basketball team represented North Carolina State University in the 2012–13 NCAA Division I men's basketball season. The team's head coach was Mark Gottfried in his second season. The team played their home games at PNC Arena in Raleigh, North Carolina, as a member of the Atlantic Coast Conference. They finished the season 24–11, 11–7 in ACC play to finish in a tie for fourth place. They advanced to the semifinals of the ACC tournament where they lost to Miami (FL). They received an at-large bid to the 2013 NCAA tournament where they lost in the second round to Temple.

Preseason
National pundits talked a lot about the Wolfpack in their early preseason discussions of the top teams in the country. NC State returned its top four leading scorers from the 2011-12 season in C. J. Leslie (14.7 ppg), Lorenzo Brown (12.7 ppg), Scott Wood (12.4 ppg) and Richard Howell (10.8 ppg). In addition, NC State landed Rodney Purvis, Tyler Lewis, and T. J. Warren to wrap up a Top 10 recruiting class. ESPN’s Andy Katz had the Wolfpack as the top rated ACC squad, at No. 6, in his early predictions. His counterpart, Sports Illustrated’s Luke Winn, had the Wolfpack listed as the No. 5 team in the nation according to his power rankings. NC State was ranked 20th in the final ESPN/USA Today Coaches Poll following its Sweet Sixteen run in the NCAA Tournament.

Class of 2012 Signees

Roster

* Left team November 26, 2012

Schedule and results
NC State's January 12 win over (AP) #1 Duke was the program's sixth win over an AP #1 program and their second over Duke as the AP #1 team.  NC State's last win over an AP #1 team was Feb. 15, 2004, also over Duke.  ESPN's College GameDay covered the January 26th game against UNC, marking the first and only time that the Wolfpack have appeared on the basketball version of the program.

|-
!colspan=12 style="background:#E00000; color:white;"| Exhibition

|-
!colspan=12 style="background:#E00000; color:white;"| Non-conference regular season

|-
!colspan=12 style="background:#E00000; color:white;"| ACC Regular Season

|-
!colspan=12 style="background:#E00000; color:white;"| 2013 ACC Tournament

|-
!colspan=12 style="background:#E00000; color:white;"| 2013 NCAA Tournament

Rankings

References

North Carolina State
NC State Wolfpack men's basketball seasons
North Carolina State
NC State Wolfpack men's basketball
NC State Wolfpack men's basketball